Carl August Ringvold (3 April 1876 – 22 February 1960) was a Norwegian sailor who competed in the 1920 Summer Olympics and in the 1924 Summer Olympics. In 1920 he was a crew member of the Norwegian boat Irene, which won the gold medal in the 8 Metre (1907 rating). Four years later he won his second gold medal in the 8 metre class together with his son Carl Ringvold, Jr.

References

External links
profile

1876 births
1960 deaths
Norwegian male sailors (sport)
Sailors at the 1920 Summer Olympics – 8 Metre
Sailors at the 1924 Summer Olympics – 8 Metre
Olympic sailors of Norway
Olympic gold medalists for Norway
Olympic medalists in sailing
Medalists at the 1924 Summer Olympics
Medalists at the 1920 Summer Olympics
Sportspeople from Oslo